Supermodelo 2007 was the second season of Supermodelo. Due to the success of the previous season the number of contestants was increased from 13 to 20 girls. The show took place live once every week, where a public vote decided which one of two nominated contestants would be eliminated from the competition, and the judges would nominate a new set of contestants for elimination. The period in between was pre-recorded, and tracked the progress of all the girls as they received lessons on various aspects of modeling, took part in photo shoot sessions and other fashion related challenges. The goal of the show was to find Spain's next representative in the Elite Model Look contest.

The winner of the competition was 21-year-old Noelia López from Seville.

Episodes

Castings 
Originally aired: 13–17 August 2007

Prior to the beginning of the main competition, a short series of 22-minute segments following the castings aired twice a day from Monday through friday beginning on 13 August.

Gala 1 
Originally aired: 27 August 2007

Lisa, Janire, Gracia and Dabryna were eliminated from the competition, leaving sixteen girls standing. The remaining girls had a casting for Custo Barcelona, where Isabel and Marta V. were selected to attend one of his shows in New York City. At the end of the week, Magdalena and Irene were nominated for elimination.

 Eliminated: Lisa Charlotte, Janire Alejos, Gracia de Torres & Dabryna Sedeno
 Nominated for elimination: Irene Valerón & Magdalena Pérez

Gala 2 
Originally aired: 3 September 2007

Irene was chosen by the public as the first contestant to be eliminated from the competition. The remaining models had to face a second round of nominations, but only after taking part in a summer-themed runway show. The final test was a bridal runway show where the girls had to wear designs by Rosa Clará. Sandra and Paola were nominated for elimination.

 Eliminated: Irene Valerón
 Nominated for elimination: Paola Ditano & Sandra Girón

Gala 3 
Originally aired: 10 September 2007
 Eliminated: Paola Ditano
 Nominated for elimination: Marta Abarrategui & Raquel Hernández

Gala 4 
Originally aired: 17 September 2007
 Eliminated: Raquel Hernández
 Nominated for elimination: Marta Abarrategui & Sandra Girón

Gala 5 
Originally aired: 24 September 2007
 Eliminated: Marta Abbarategui
 Nominated for elimination: Magdalena Pérez & Sandra Girón

Gala 6 
Originally aired: 1 October 2007
 Eliminated: Sandra Girón
 Nominated for elimination: Jessica Ruíz & Marta Vicente

Gala 7 
Originally aired: 8 October 2007
 Eliminated: Jessica Ruíz
 Nominated for elimination: Marta Vicente & Paloma Bloyd

Gala 8 
Originally aired: 15 October 2007
 Quit: Marta Vicente
 Nominated for elimination: Silvia Salleras & Zaida Rodríguez

Gala 9 
Originally aired: 22 October 2007
 Eliminated: Silvia Salleras
 Nominated for elimination: Paula Hidalgo & Zaida Rodríguez

Gala 10 
Originally aired: 29 October 2007
 Eliminated: Paula Hidalgo
 Nominated for elimination: Magdalena Pérez & Paula Bernaldez

Gala 11 
Originally aired: 5 November 2007
 Eliminated: Paula Bernaldez
 Nominated for elimination: Paloma Bloyd & Zaida Rodríguez

Gala 12 
Originally aired: 12 November 2007
 Quit: Zaida Rodríguez
 Finalist: Noelia López
 Nominated for the final: Alba Carrillo & Isabel Cañete
 Nominated for elimination: Magdalena Pérez & Paloma Bloyd

Semifinal 
Originally aired: 19 November 2007
 Immune: Noelia López
 Finalist: Isabel Cañete
 Eligible for elimination: Alba Carrillo, Magdalena Pérez & Paloma Bloyd
 Eliminated: Paloma Bloyd

Final 
Originally aired: 26 November 2007
 4th place: Alba Carrillo
 3rd place: Isabel Cañete
 Runner-up: Magdalena Pérez 
 Supermodelo 2007: Noelia López

Contestants
(ages stated are at start of contest)

Results

 ELIM  The contestant was eliminated 
 SAFE  The contestant was a candidate for nomination but was saved 
 NOM  The contestant was nominated for elimination 
 QUIT  The contestant quit the competition
 FINAL  The contestant advanced to the finale
 NOM  The contestant was nominated for a place in the final
 IMMUNE  The contestant was exempt from elimination
 WINNER  The contestant won the competition

 In gala 1, Lisa, Janire, Gracia and Dabryna were eliminated by the judging panel before nominating Irene and Magdalena for elimination by the public.
 In gala 8, Marta V. quit the competition, automatically saving Paloma from elimination.
 In gala 12, Zaida quit the competition, automatically saving Paloma from elimination. It was later revealed that Zaida would have been eliminated regardless of her decision to quit. Noelia was selected by the contestants to advance to the final. Alba and Isabel were nominated by the judges for one of the three remaining spots in the final. This left Magdalena and Paloma in danger of elimination.
 In gala 13, Isabel was selected to advance to the final by the public, which left Alba in danger of elimination along with Magdalena and Paloma. The contestant with the fewest votes was Paloma, and she was eliminated as a result.

Judges and mentors
 Judit Mascó - host
 Daniel El Kum - stylist & judge
 Manuel Batista - stylist & judge
 Vicky Martín Berrocal - designer & judge
 Cristina Rodríguez - stylist
 Emmanuel Rouzic - photographer
 Javier Martínez - nutritionist
 Jimmy Roca - fitness coach
 Marta Romero - acting coach
 Rubén Nsue - dancing instructor
 Valerio Pino- runway coach

Viewing figures

References

External links
 Official website (archive at the Wayback Machine)

2000s Spanish television series